Ludwig van Beethoven's Piano Sonata No. 16 in G major, Op. 31, No. 1, was composed between 1801 and 1802. Although it was numbered as the first piece in the trio of piano sonatas which were published as Opus 31 in 1803, Beethoven actually finished it after the Op. 31 No. 2, the Tempest Sonata.

Due to his dissatisfaction with the classical style of music, Beethoven pledged to take a new path of musical composition and style. The Opus 31 works are the first examples of Beethoven's new and unconventional ideas, an attempt to make a name for himself in the annals of music history. For example, the first movement, unlike most sonata allegro forms in which the second theme of the exposition is dominant, the second theme is in B major and B minor, the mediant of the original key. Beethoven would later continue to use the mediant and submediant as expositional goals for major-key sonata-form movements, such as the first movements of the Waldstein and Hammerklavier sonatas, the Archduke trio, the triple concerto and the thirteenth string quartet, as well as the finale to the seventh symphony. It is important to take into account that these pieces were written after the famous Heiligenstadt Testament of 1802.

This sonata is light, breezy and has touches of humour and irony in its movements. Critics say that the Opus 31 works show now a more pronounced "Beethovenian" sense of style that will become more evident in later, mature works.

Structure 
The sonata consists of three movements. A typical performance lasts about 20 minutes.

Allegro vivace

The first movement begins in an animated fashion. The humorous main theme is littered with brisk, semiquaver passages, and chords written in a stuttering fashion, suggesting that the hands are unable to play in unison with one another. The second subject in the exposition alternates between B major and B minor; this tendency to alternate between keys became typical later in Beethoven's career.

Adagio grazioso

With long, drawn out trills and reflective pauses, the second movement in C major is the more sentimental movement. Apart from the Hammerklavier Sonata'''s Adagio'' and the 32nd sonata's second movement, this is the longest slow movement of Beethoven in the piano sonatas (around 11 minutes). According to many great pianists (e.g. Edwin Fischer and András Schiff), this movement is a parody of Italian opera and Beethoven's contemporaries, who were much more popular than Beethoven at the beginning of the 19th century. Schiff explained this theory in his master class of this sonata; he said it is totally uncharacteristic of Beethoven because it is not economical, it is incredibly long, everything is too much ornamented, it is filled with "show-off cadenzas (...) who are trying to make a cheap effect" and bel canto-like elements and rhythms (on them Schiff said "it's very beautiful, but it's alien to Beethoven's nature").

Rondo

The last movement is similar in character to the first movement: light, enthusiastic, and youthful. Here, a single simple theme is varied, ornamented, syncopated, modulated throughout the piece. After a brief Adagio section, the piece ends with a Presto coda.

References

External links

A lecture by András Schiff on Beethoven's piano sonata Op. 31, No. 1
 

Piano Sonata 16
1802 compositions
Compositions in G major
Humor in classical music